Morton William Newman (1917-2001) was a prominent urban affairs reporter for the Chicago Daily News from 1945 until the paper’s end in 1978. Born in 1917 in New York, Newman studied journalism at the University of Wisconsin–Madison, before working at papers in both the Midwest and East Coast. When he started at the Daily News, he held many different roles, from doing copy editing to food writing. Although best known for his coverage of crime and local news in Chicago, he spent most of his later career writing for Inland Architect and Architectural Forum while also writing arts reviews for both the Chicago Tribune and Chicago Sun-Times. Newman married his wife Nancy in 1962 and died in 2001.

External links
 M.W. Newman Papers at Newberry Library

1917 births
2011 deaths
University of Wisconsin–Madison School of Journalism & Mass Communication alumni
Writers from Chicago
Writers from New York (state)
Chicago Sun-Times people